The Great Whipsnade Railway, also known as The Jumbo Express, is an English,  narrow gauge heritage railway that operates within ZSL Whipsnade Zoo in Bedfordshire, England.

Overview

Construction of the railway started in 1970 and the initial line opened on 26 August 1970. The line provided rides within the animal enclosures and an additional attraction in its own right. Originally called the Whipsnade and Umfolozi Railway, it began as a short line running from near the children's zoo. It was later extended to form a loop through several paddocks. The railway is now over a mile in length.

The line was primarily equipped from the Bowater's Railway (now Sittingbourne & Kemsley Light Railway) in Sittingbourne, Kent, which was the last steam-operated narrow gauge industrial railway in the United Kingdom. The railway is now equipped with four steam locomotives and five diesels (although one has been sold to the Sittingbourne & Kemsley Light Railway). All passenger trains are steam hauled and services commence at midday, with train departures every half hour with the last train departing Whipsnade Central one hour before Whipsnade Zoo closes for the day.

The route

The train normally travels clockwise around the loop.  Leaving the station the train travels east under the foot bridge and passing the children's play area and children's farm on the left.  At this point the track crosses the road.  There are no barriers but the crossing is controlled by an automated warning system.  Past the crossing the track begins to curve to the right and descend slightly, passing the emu paddock on the right and the train yard, including the engine shed, on the left. Visitors can sometimes catch a glimpse of a steam or diesel locomotive sitting in the shed, or the diesels Hector and Victor in a siding adjacent to the running track.

The track then curves more sharply to the right before straightening up and passing the first elephant paddock on the left.  The route then crosses a wide footpath used to move the elephants between paddocks.  This crossing is equipped with barriers.  The Route continues roughly straight and level past the elephant and Asian rhino paddocks on the right before crossing over a road and entering into the area of the zoo known as passage through Asia.  Here there are no barriers between the train and the animals, which consist of Bactrian Camels, Yak and Pere David Deer.

The track then crosses the big Ha-ha and turns to the right passing through the deer park (also known as Cut throat paddock) and the Przewalski horses on the right.  Here the track slopes downhill before passing through the tunnel.

Emerging from the tunnel into round close paddock the train passes the Africa paddock on the left which contains Gemsbok, Ostrich and common Zebra and Lake Daedelus on the right. Here the track curves more sharply to the right and climbs uphill back to the station level crossing central avenue just before reaching the platform. This level crossing has gates and is manned by platform staff during train operation. The Whipsnade Central station has an old-fashioned signal box which can be seen when leaving or approaching the station platform.

Locomotives

Steam locomotives

Diesel locomotives

Battery Locomotives

See also
 British narrow gauge railways
 Umfolozi River
 Hluhluwe-Umfolozi Game Reserve

References

External links

 ZSL Whipsnade Zoo website
 The Sittingbourne and Kemsley Railway website

1970 establishments in England
Railway lines opened in 1970
Heritage railways in Bedfordshire
2 ft 6 in gauge railways in England